The Dutch Five guilder coin was the highest-denomination coin in the Netherlands from its introduction in 1988 until the adoption of the euro in 2002. Its nominal value was ƒ 5,- (€ 2.27).

All of its mintings featured the portrait of Queen Beatrix on the obverse.

History
After a first few isolated issues in low numbers under the kings William I and William II in the early 19th century, a gold five guilder coin was issued under Queen Wilhelmina in 1912. One million pieces were struck that year but none were struck in the following years of her reign. Many of these ended up in necklaces and bracelets, and its popularity as a jewel meant that imitations were made without the coin.

The introduction of a 5 guilder coin was first discussed and eventually approved in 1981. It would replace the 5 guilder note in circulation at the time. However, at the time De Nederlandsche Bank (Central Bank of the Netherlands) had a very large supply of these banknotes in stock. Thus, in order to prevent wasting them, it was decided to postpone the introduction of the coin for several years.
The new coin had to fit in the current series. The ministry of finance reported it was to become "gold-coloured" and "smaller than the guilder coin and thicker than the rijksdaalder (2½ guilder coin)". It was introduced on 1 May 1988.

In 2000 a commemorative 5 guilder coin was struck in honour of the UEFA Euro 2000 in the Netherlands and Belgium. The 5 guilder coin was withdrawn from circulation on 28 January 2002 following the introduction of the euro. It remained tender to be exchanged for currency of the euro until 1 January 2007.

Mintage  

The following number of coins have been struck.

 

As of October 2002, 153,000,000 (70.61%) of  5 Guilder coins had been returned to the national bank.

Commemorative coin of the UEFA European Championship
A special coin of 5 guilder was struck in honour of the UEFA Euro 2000 football championship held in the Netherlands and Belgium in 2000. It would be the only commemorative coin valued 5 guilder.

The first coins were struck in Utrecht on 3 May 2000. The coin was distributed from 4 May onward through four large supermarket branches (Basismarkt, Edah, Konmar and Super de Boer). Belgium minted a commemorative 50-Franc coin (in both French and Dutch) in honour of the European Championship.

The mintage numbers were as follows:

The Dutch national mint also minted a number of FDC and Proof coins, intended for sale. Sale prices at the time are listed above. Also a set including both the Dutch and Belgian European Championship-coins in FDC-quality was sold for ƒ 59.95 (€ 27.20).

Sources
Kerstpers, Magazine of the Dutch national mint, November 2000.

Coins of the Netherlands
Five-base-unit coins